In geometry, the order-8 triangular tiling is a regular tiling of the hyperbolic plane. It is represented by Schläfli symbol of {3,8}, having eight regular triangles around each vertex.

Uniform colorings 
The half symmetry [1+,8,3] = [(4,3,3)] can be shown with alternating two colors of triangles:

Symmetry

From [(4,4,4)] symmetry, there are 15 small index subgroups (7 unique) by mirror removal and alternation operators. Mirrors can be removed if its branch orders are all even, and cuts neighboring branch orders in half. Removing two mirrors leaves a half-order gyration point where the removed mirrors met. In these images fundamental domains are alternately colored black and white, and mirrors exist on the boundaries between colors. Adding 3 bisecting mirrors across each fundamental domains creates 832 symmetry. The subgroup index-8 group, [(1+,4,1+,4,1+,4)] (222222) is the commutator subgroup of [(4,4,4)].

A larger subgroup is constructed [(4,4,4*)], index 8, as (2*2222) with gyration points removed, becomes (*22222222).

The symmetry can be doubled to 842 symmetry by adding a bisecting mirror across the fundamental domains. The symmetry can be extended by 6, as 832 symmetry, by 3 bisecting mirrors per domain.

Related polyhedra and tilings 

From a Wythoff construction there are ten hyperbolic uniform tilings that can be based from the regular octagonal and order-8 triangular tilings.

Drawing the tiles colored as red on the original faces, yellow at the original vertices, and blue along the original edges, there are 10 forms.

It can also be generated from the (4 3 3) hyperbolic tilings:

See also

Order-8 tetrahedral honeycomb
Tilings of regular polygons
List of uniform planar tilings
List of regular polytopes

References

 John H. Conway, Heidi Burgiel, Chaim Goodman-Strass, The Symmetries of Things 2008,  (Chapter 19, The Hyperbolic Archimedean Tessellations)

External links 

 Hyperbolic and Spherical Tiling Gallery
 KaleidoTile 3: Educational software to create spherical, planar and hyperbolic tilings
 Hyperbolic Planar Tessellations, Don Hatch

Hyperbolic tilings
Isogonal tilings
Isohedral tilings
Order-8 tilings
Regular tilings
Triangular tilings